Golzar (also Romanized as Golzār; also known as Tappeh Soleymān) is a village in Khangiran Rural District, in the Central District of Sarakhs County, Razavi Khorasan Province, Iran. At the 2006 census, its population was 120, in 28 families.

References 

Populated places in Sarakhs County